Rafaela Guedes (born May 23, 1992) is a Brazilian submission grappler, and Brazilian jiu-jitsu (BJJ) black belt athlete. An IBJJF World champion at brown belt, Guedes is a two-time World No-Gi, Pan American (Gi and No-GI) black belt champion. Originally from Manaus, Brazil now fighting out of San Diego, California, Guedes is also the WNO women's heavyweight champion, a 2021 World jiu-jitsu double medallist and the 2022 ADCC Submission Fighting silver medallist.

Biography 
Rafaela Ribeiro Guedes was born on 23 May 1992, in Manaus, Brazil. She played handball from the age of 10 until she was forced to stop following an injury at the age of sixteen. After watching her cousin compete, she started Brazilian Jiu-Jitsu (BJJ) near her grandmother's house at a neighbourhood's social project before joining Academia Dailson Pinheiro de Jiu-Jitsu in Manaus where she earned her blue belt. At 22 she moved to São Paulo joining Leandro Lo’s New School Brotherhood academy. After moving to San Diego, California to join Atos Academy under André Galvão, Guedes earned her black belt in September 2020.

Competitive summary 
Main achievements:

 Jitsmagazine BJJ Awards 'Female Breakout Grappler of the Year' (2020)
 IBJJF World No-Gi Champion (2021)
 IBJJF Pan Champion (2020)
 IBJJF Pan Championship No-Gi Champion (2020)
 WNO heavyweight champion (2021)
 2022 ADCC Submission Fighting World Championship + 60 kg silver medallist
 2nd place IBJJF World Championship (2022)
 3rd place IBJJF World Championship (2022)

In coloured belts:
 IBJJF World Champion (2019 brown)
 UAFJJF Grand Slam, Miami (2020 brown & black)
 UAFJJF Grand Slam, L.A (2017 purple)
 2nd Place IBJJF World Championship No-Gi (2019 brown)
 2nd Place UAFJJF Grand Slam, Rio (2017 purple)
 3rd Place IBJJF World Championship (2016 purple, 2019  brown)
 3rd place IBJJF World Championship No-Gi (2019  brown)
 3rd place CBJJ Brazilian Nationals (2016 / 2017 / 2018 purple)
 3rd place UAFJJF Grand Slam, L.A (2019 brown + black)

Notes

References 

Living people
Brazilian practitioners of Brazilian jiu-jitsu
People awarded a black belt in Brazilian jiu-jitsu
People from Manaus
Brazilian submission wrestlers
1992 births